Drifting Clouds is a 1996 Finnish comedy drama film edited, written, produced, and directed by Aki Kaurismäki and starring Kati Outinen, Kari Väänänen and Markku Peltola. The film is the first in Kaurismäki's Finland trilogy, the other two films being The Man Without a Past and Lights in the Dusk. The film was selected as the Finnish entry for the Best Foreign Language Film at the 69th Academy Awards, but was not accepted as a nominee.

Plot
Ilona Koponen (Kati Outinen), a head waitress at Dubrovnik restaurant, is married to Lauri (Kari Väänänen), a tram driver. They live in a small, modestly furnished apartment in Helsinki. As they come home from work late one night, Lauri surprises Ilona with a television which he purchased on hire purchase. They talk about whether they can meet their financial obligations, but agree that the TV payments are manageable.

Next day, as Lauri gets to work, he learns that the company will be laying off workers due to the non-profitability of certain tram routes and he is randomly chosen as one of those. The day after Lauri has finished his last shift, Ilona is informed by the owner of Dubrovnik that the restaurant is being sold to a chain and that all employees will be let go since the new company will be bringing in its own staff.

Both start looking for work but with discouraging results. Lauri is offered a job as a bus driver but is unable to pass the medical exam and subsequently loses his professional driver's licence. Ilona gets a job at a rundown bar/restaurant which does not even have a name and is owned by a tax-evading crook. After six weeks, the restaurant gets shut down by the government and Ilona is not paid by the dishonest owner.

During their search for employment, Lauri and Ilona have bouts of heavy-drinking, all the while running into former colleagues who have similar difficulties. At one point, the two even sell their car and take the proceedings to a casino in hopes of doubling the money but end up losing it all. Most of their furniture, as well as the new TV that Lauri bought, is repossessed.

One day, Ilona accidentally runs into Mrs Sjöholm (Elina Salo), her former boss. Sjöholm suggests that Ilona open up a restaurant. Since Ilona does not have the means for such a venture, Sjöholm agrees to provide the capital as a loan. Ilona, humbled by her recent experiences, is initially reluctant to accept for fear of the restaurant failing and her not being able to repay Mrs Sjöholm, but eventually agrees.

Ilona names the restaurant Work and hires some of the staff from Dubrovnik, including the troubled chef, Lajunen (Markku Peltola), plus Lauri. Filled with anxiety during a slow lunch hour on opening day, Ilona's worries disappear as she watches the restaurant fill to capacity later the same afternoon. After receiving a call from a Helsinki union asking for a reservation for thirty people, Lauri and Ilona stand on the front steps of the restaurant unable to express their feelings of joy, looking at the skies as more people enter.

Cast and characters
Kati Outinen - Ilona Koponen
Kari Väänänen - Lauri Koponen
Elina Salo - Rouva Sjöholm
Sakari Kuosmanen - Melartin
Markku Peltola - Lajunen
Matti Onnismaa - Forsström
Shelley Fisher - Pianist

Reception

Critical response
Although the film was not as widely distributed as an average Hollywood feature and, as a result, was not a commercial success to the same extent, it was well received by film critics worldwide while also winning several major film awards. As of 5 February 2008, the aggregate review website Rotten Tomatoes only registered 9 reviews for the film, all of which were positive and averaged a 7.1 rating out of a possible 10. Film critic Roger Ebert awarded the film three-and-a-half stars out of 4, all the while praising Kaurismäki's "subtle irony" and challenging the widely accepted description of Kaurismäki as a minimalist by offering his opinion that the "screen is saturated with images and ideas". Damian Cannon of Movie Reviews UK awarded the film 4 stars out of 5 calling it "an examination of life and how to survive misfortune, unscrupulous characters and your own lack of foresight" and concluding that "Kaurismäki succeeds impressively".

Accolades

Won
Cannes Film Festival
Prize of the Ecumenical Jury - Special Mention - Aki Kaurismäki
Belgian Syndicate of Cinema Critics (1997)
Grand Prix
Jussi Awards (1997)
Best Film
Best Actress - Kati Outinen
Best Direction - Aki Kaurismäki
Best Script - Aki Kaurismäki
Best Supporting Actress - Elina Salo
São Paulo International Film Festival (1996)
Audience Award - Best Feature
Tromsø International Film Festival (1997)
Import Award

Nominated
Cannes Film Festival
Golden Palm (Lost to Secrets & Lies)
Original Music (Lonesome Traveler) - Shelley Fisher

See also
1996 in film
Cinema of Finland
List of Finnish films: 1990s
Early 1990s recession in Finland
List of submissions to the 69th Academy Awards for Best Foreign Language Film
List of Finnish submissions for the Academy Award for Best Foreign Language Film

References

External links
 
 
 
 
 
 
 

1996 films
Films directed by Aki Kaurismäki
1990s Finnish-language films
1996 comedy-drama films
Finnish comedy-drama films